Eloise Broady DeJoria (born May 13, 1957) is an American model, actress, producer, businesswoman and philanthropist. As actress, she is known for Weekend at Bernie's.

Personal life and career 
She was chosen as Playboy's Playmate for April 1988. Her business enterprises include Ultimate Face Professional, Arbor Behavioral Healthcare, and Renew Logic.

She is involved in some charities, such as Help Clifford Help Kids, The Palmer Drug Abuse Program, The Austin Recovery Center, The Austin Children's Shelter, Helping Hands, as well as Club 100, Long Center for the Performing Arts, The Paramount Theater, and The Austin Film Society. She is a business partner with John Paul.

Married her husband, billionaire John Paul DeJoria in 1993.

Film career 
She played Tawny in Weekend at Bernie's, a film starring Jonathan Silverman. She also appeared in Songwriter (1984),Friday Night Lights, Grand Champion, Our Wild Hearts, and You Don't Mess with the Zohan. She acted in Robert Davi's directorial debut, The Dukes.
She's the hot blond in Kiss's Reason to Live video, circa 87-88.

References

External links 

 

1957 births
Living people
1980s Playboy Playmates
American actresses
American women in business
21st-century American women